Jenny Ann Rathbone (born  12 February 1950) is a Welsh Labour and Co-operative politician who has been a Member of the Senedd (MS) since 2011.

Career
She was Labour candidate for Cardiff Central at the 2010 General Election coming second to Liberal Democrat Jenny Willott. She was previously a Labour councillor in the London Borough of Islington from 1998 to 2002.

Rathbone has represented the constituency of Cardiff Central since the Senedd election of May 2011. She won the seat from the Liberal Democrats by 38 votes.

She voted for Jeremy Corbyn in Labour's 2015 leadership election. In October 2015 Jenny Rathbone criticised the Welsh Labour government for spending millions on the M4 Relief Road. First Minister Carwyn Jones then removed Rathbone from her chairmanship of the All Wales European Programme Monitoring Committee. In doing so Mr Jones said: "The chair of the programme monitoring committee is an appointment made by the First Minister, because that person, as is made clear in a letter of appointment, is a representative of the (Labour) Welsh Government." He said it is made clear that the "person is required to have particular regards to act in the spirit of collective responsibility, the main principles of the ministerial code."

On 5 May 2016 Rathbone was elected for a second term as AM for Cardiff Central, winning by 817 votes.

Controversy
In November 2018 it was reported that Rathbone was facing disciplinary action from the Labour Party for her comments a year earlier in which she suggested that the Jewish community's need for security at synagogues stemmed from a "siege mentality".

Personal life
Jenny Rathbone was born in Liverpool. She speaks fluent French and Spanish. She has two children and lives in Roath, Cardiff.

References

External links
Official website

Offices held

 

1950 births
Living people
Labour Co-operative members of the Senedd
Wales AMs 2011–2016
Wales MSs 2016–2021
Wales MSs 2021–2026
Female members of the Senedd
Councillors in the London Borough of Islington
Labour Party (UK) councillors
Labour Party (UK) parliamentary candidates
Members of the Fabian Society
Politicians from Liverpool
Women councillors in England